Green Lake, Michigan may refer to:

 Green Lake (Grand Traverse County, Michigan)
 Green Lake (Washtenaw County, Michigan)
 Green Lake Township, Grand Traverse County, Michigan
 Green Lake, Allegan County, Michigan, an unincorporated community